CAPOS syndrome is a rare genetic neurological disorder which is characterized by abnormalities of the feet, eyes and brain which affect their normal function. These symptoms occur episodically when a fever-related infection is present within the body.

Signs and symptoms 

Usually, individuals with this condition have cerebellar ataxia, areflexia, high-arched feet, optic nerve wasting/degeneration, sensorineural deafness.

These symptoms have variable onset, but they generally begin episodically after having a fever-causing infection such as the common cold, manifesting mainly as sudden-onset ataxic episodes and encephalopathy. Other triggers include pregnancy and giving birth. Other symptoms that occur during the episodic ataxia includes hypotonia, nystagmus, strabismus, dysarthria, dysphagia, areflexia/hyporeflexia, and temporary deafness. More serious symptoms include loss of consciousness and/or onset of a coma.

These symptoms usually improve alongside the illness that caused the fever.

General frequency of episodes with people suffering from CAPOS syndrome is 1-3.

Complications 

There are various complications associated with the disorder, some of them include vision impairment/blindness due to optic atrophy characteristic of the disorder, deafness due to atrophy of the nerves that aid in hearing, problems with walking due to the ataxia, etc.

Causes 

This condition is caused by autosomal dominant missense mutations in the ATP1A3 gene, in chromosome 19. The mutation is thought to be gain-of-function.

Epidemiology 

According to OMIM, only 14 cases have been described in medical literature.

History 

This condition was first discovered in 1996 by Nicolaides et al. when they described a mother and two siblings (brother and sister) with (summarized) early-onset reoccurring cerebellar ataxia and progressive optic atrophy accompanied by sensorineural deafness.

References 

Rare genetic syndromes
Syndromes with sensorineural hearing loss
Syndromes affecting the optic nerve
Autosomal dominant disorders
Episodic and paroxysmal disorders